Lake Pinchot is a lake in Sweet Grass County, Montana, in the United States.

Lake Pinchot was named in honor of Gifford Pinchot, a park service official.

See also
List of lakes in Montana

References

Lakes of Montana
Bodies of water of Sweet Grass County, Montana